The 2909 Squadron of the RAF Regiment saw action in Greece taking part in an invasion of the island of Kos from 15 September 1943 during the first time the RAF Regiment units deployed for action by air. The squadron deployed together with the 2901 Squadron, both armed with 33 Hispano-Suiza HS.404 anti-aircraft guns in support of the 1 battalion Durham Light Infantry.

See also
Military history of Greece during World War II

References

Citations

Bibliography
 Gartzonikas, Panagiotis, Lieut. Col., Hellenic Army, Amphibious and Special Operations in the Aegean Sea 1943-1945. Operational Effectiveness and Strategic Implications, (thesis), Naval Postgraduate School, Monterey, CA, 2003

Further reading
 Kingsley M Oliver, Through Adversity: : History of the Royal Air Force Regiment, Forces & Corporate Publishing Ltd., 1997

External links
 https://web.archive.org/web/20080627121632/http://www.raf.mod.uk/history/rafhistorytimeline1943.cfm RAF Timeline 1943

Royal Air Force Regiment squadrons